Glottidia is a genus of brachiopods belonging to the family Lingulidae.

The species of this genus are found in Europe and Northern America.

Species:

Glottidia albida 
Glottidia audebarti 
Glottidia bravardi 
Glottidia inexpectans 
Glottidia palmeri 
Glottidia pyramidata 
Glottidia semen

References

Brachiopod genera